Jiapeng Liedao ( or ), also known as Asses' Ears, the Kaipong Islands (derived from the Cantonese pronunciation of the Chinese name) or Ky-poong, is a group of islands off the coast of Guangdong in China. They form a chain of rocks and islands extending 10 miles SE from Eyan Shi Dao (O-yen Shih) to Wenwei Zhou. The islands are part of the Wanshan Archipelago.

Name
Beijian Dao, also called Kaipong, gave its name to the island group. Also, two peaks rising almost perpendicularly to a height of 300m on the southwestern end of the island, are known as Asses' Ears. They also gave their name to the archipelago.

Islands
There are two major islands in the northeast and a group of minor islands in the southwest. One major island is Beijian Dao. The other island is Yunghoy or Yung-gai.

References

Wanshan Archipelago
Uninhabited islands of China
Islands of Guangdong
Islands of China